Abelardo Albisi (1872–1938) was an Italian flutist and instrument maker and composer. He was first flutist of the orchestra at La Scala for many years. In 1910 he invented the albisiphone, a type of bass flute. The instrument achieved some popularity in Italy and was notably included in the scores of several operas by Riccardo Zandonai and Pietro Mascagni, and in symphonic music by Friedrich Klose among other composers.

References

External links
 

1872 births
1938 deaths
Flute makers
Italian classical flautists